Høybuktmoen is a moor area in the municipality of Sør-Varanger in Troms og Finnmark county, Norway. It is the site of Kirkenes Airport, Høybuktmoen and the Garrison of Sør-Varanger. Høybuktmoen is located on a small peninsula between the Bøkfjorden and Korsfjorden. The European route E6 highway runs just south of Høybuktmoen.

See also
Nazi concentration camps in Norway

References

Sør-Varanger
Norwegian Army bases
Military installations in Troms og Finnmark
Villages in Troms og Finnmark